Neocalyptis chlansignum is a species of moth of the family Tortricidae. It is found in India (Jammu and Kashmir).

The ground colour of the forewings is cream, sprinkled with brown. The markings are greyish brown. The hindwings are brownish grey.

Etymology
The species name refers to the shape of the signum and is derived from Greek  (meaning slender).

References

External links

Moths described in 2006
Moths of Asia
Neocalyptis
Taxa named by Józef Razowski